.25 caliber may refer to the following firearms cartridges:

Pistol cartridges

.25 in (6.5 mm)

See also
6 mm caliber

References

Pistol and rifle cartridges